Guillaume-Joseph Roques (1757–1847) was a French neoclassical and romantic painter.

He taught at the Royal Academy of Arts in Toulouse where Jean Auguste Dominique Ingres was among his pupils. He was a prolific artist and one of the most notable exponents of neoclassicism outside of the centre of the movement in Paris, though later in life he tended towards romanticism.

His most notable paintings include a copy of Jacques-Louis David's The Death of Marat (1793) and a series of works covering the life of the Virgin Mary, painted from 1810 to 1820 for the choir of the church of Notre-Dame de la Daurade in Toulouse.

1757 births
1847 deaths
French neoclassical painters
French romantic painters
18th-century French painters
French male painters
19th-century French painters
19th-century French male artists
18th-century French male artists